The Sawantwadi Road–Madgaon Passenger is a passenger train belonging to Konkan Railway that runs between  and . It is currently operated with 50107/50108 train numbers on a daily basis.

Average speed and frequency 

The 50107/Sawantwadi Road–Madgaon Passenger runs with an average speed of 34 km/h and completes 76 km in 2h 15m. The 50108/Madgaon–Sawantwadi Road Passenger runs with an average speed of 35 km/h and completes 76 km in 2h 10m.

Route and halts 

The important halts of the train are:

Coach composite 

The train has standard ICF rakes with max speed of 110 kmph. The train consists of 18 coaches:

 16 General Unreserved
 2 Seating cum Luggage Rake

Traction

Both trains are hauled by a Golden Rock Loco Shed-based WDM-3A diesel locomotive from Sawantwadi to Madgaon and vice versa.

Rake sharing 

The train shares its rake with 50105/50106 Diva–Sawantwadi Passenger and 50119/50120 Dadar Central–Ratnagiri Passenger.

See also 

 Sawantwadi Road railway station
 Madgaon Junction railway station
 Diva–Panvel Passenger
 Sindhudurg Passenger

Notes

References

External links 

 50107/Sawantwadi Road–Madgaon Passenger India Rail Info
 50108/Madgaon–Sawantwadi Road Passenger India Rail Info

Transport in Sawantwadi
Transport in Margao
Rail transport in Maharashtra
Rail transport in Goa
Slow and fast passenger trains in India
Railway services introduced in 2015
Konkan Railway